Summit Station, California may refer to;

 Beaumont, California, in Riverside County
 Tehachapi, California, in Kern County